Shericka Jackson, OD (born 16 July 1994) is a Jamaican sprinter competing in the 100 m, 200 m, and 400 metres. She is the fastest woman alive and second fastest woman of all time in the 200 metres since 2022.

Jackson started her career as a 400 m sprinter, winning bronze at the 2016 Rio Olympics, 2015 World Championships and 2019 World Championships. At the same competitions, she added medals in the 4 x 400 m relays, taking a silver, gold and bronze, respectively. She earned also the gold medal in the 4 x 100 m relay at the 2019 World Championships.

After Jackson shifted to shorter sprints in 2021 she won bronze in the 100 m at the 2020 Tokyo Olympics, adding a gold and bronze for
the 4 x 100 m and 4 x 400 m relays respectively. That year, she achieved sub-10.8-second and sub-22-second personal bests in the 100 m and 200 m respectively and with her 400 m lifetime best below 49.5 s she became one of few women to reach such marks at all those events simultaneously. At the 2022 World Championships, Jackson won a silver for the 100 m, gold in the 200 m setting national record, and a silver for the 4 x 100 m relay. She was the 2022 Diamond League 200 m champion.

Career

Since 2008 Shericka Jackson had been winning gold medals in different age categories at the CARIFTA Games, and then CACAC Junior Championships. She placed in the 200 metres finals of the 2010 Youth Olympics, 2011 World Youth Championships (3rd), and the 2012 World Junior Championships.

Her greater progress in the 400 m came at the age of 21 in 2015, when she first went under 51 seconds in June and finally sub-50-second in August.

2021
Under the guidance of renowned coach Stephen Francis, Jackson switched to the 100 m and 200 m sprints for the 2021 season, running personal bests of 10.77 s and 21.82 s respectively at the Jamaica Olympic Trials in Kingston.

She came third in the 100 m at the delayed 2020 Tokyo Olympics with even better PB of 10.76 s, just behind fellow country woman Shelly-Ann Fraser-Pryce who clocked 10.74 s. The Jamaicans swept the medal stand in the event for the second time in history as Elaine Thompson-Herah took the gold medal in 10.61 s. In the 200 metres, she failed to advance out of the heats after she slowed down before the finish line and was passed by Dalia Kaddari for the third automatic advancement spot by four one-thousandths of a second; her time of 23.26 s was not fast enough to earn one of the advancement-by-time places.

2022
Jackson continued to impress in the shorter sprints throughout the 2022 season winning 3 medals at the World Championships in Eugene, Oregon. At the Jamaican trials, she won the sprint double, clocking 10.77 seconds in the 100m and 21.55 seconds in the 200m; her 21.55-second clocking elevated her to #3 all-time. At the World Championships, Jackson won the silver medal at the 100m, in a then-personal best of 10.73 seconds making her the joint 7th fastest woman of all time and copped the gold medal in the 200m in a championship and national record of 21.45 seconds, making her the fastest woman alive and second fastest woman of all time at the event. In the 4x100 meters relay final, Jackson ran a spectacular split of 9.72 s on the anchor leg, but wasn't able to pass the American sprinter Twanisha Terry. Consequently, she and the Jamaican team consisting of Kemba Nelson, Elaine Thompson-Herah and Shelly-Ann Fraser-Pryce earned the silver medal in a season's best of 41.18 seconds, the sixth fastest time in history. At the Monaco Diamond League on 10 August, Jackson lowered her personal best to 10.71 seconds to finish second behind Fraser-Pryce (10.62 s) and just ahead of Marie-Josee Ta Lou of the Ivory Coast who ran an African Record of 10.72 s. With her result Jackson became the sixth fastest woman and third fastest Jamaican woman of all time.

Achievements

Information from World Athletics profile.

Personal bests

International competitions

Circuit wins
 Diamond League champion 200 m:  2022
 2018: Paris Meeting (200m)
 2019: London Anniversary Games (400m)
 2021: Stockholm Bauhaus-Galan (200m)
 2022: Rome Golden Gala (200m  ), Chorzów Kamila Skolimowska Memorial (200m MR), Brussels Memorial Van Damme (100m), Zürich Weltklasse (200m)

National titles
 Jamaican Athletics Championships
 200 metres: 2018, 2022
 400 metres: 2017, 2019
 100 metres: 2022

Notes

References

External links

 

1994 births
Living people
Jamaican female sprinters
World Athletics Championships athletes for Jamaica
People from Saint Ann Parish
Athletes (track and field) at the 2010 Summer Youth Olympics
World Athletics Championships medalists
Athletes (track and field) at the 2016 Summer Olympics
Olympic athletes of Jamaica
Olympic gold medalists for Jamaica
Olympic silver medalists for Jamaica
Olympic bronze medalists for Jamaica
Olympic gold medalists in athletics (track and field)
Olympic silver medalists in athletics (track and field)
Olympic bronze medalists in athletics (track and field)
Medalists at the 2016 Summer Olympics
Commonwealth Games medallists in athletics
Commonwealth Games silver medallists for Jamaica
Athletes (track and field) at the 2018 Commonwealth Games
Athletes (track and field) at the 2019 Pan American Games
Pan American Games gold medalists for Jamaica
Pan American Games medalists in athletics (track and field)
World Athletics Championships winners
Jamaican Athletics Championships winners
Pan American Games gold medalists in athletics (track and field)
Medalists at the 2019 Pan American Games
Athletes (track and field) at the 2020 Summer Olympics
Medalists at the 2020 Summer Olympics
Olympic female sprinters
Medallists at the 2018 Commonwealth Games